Darreh-ye Gandoli (also Romanized as Darreh-ye Gandolī) is a village in Kushk Rural District, Abezhdan District, Andika County, Khuzestan Province, Iran. At the 2006 census, its population was 51, with 10 families.

References 

Populated places in Andika County